Danny Faure (born 8 May 1962) is a Seychellois politician who was President of Seychelles from 16 October 2016 until 26 October 2020. Previously, he served as Vice President of Seychelles from 2010 to 2016. Faure is a member of the United Seychelles Party (PP).

Background and education
Faure was born to Seychellois parents in the western Ugandan town of Kilembe. He completed his primary and secondary education in Seychelles. He studied at the University of Havana in Cuba, graduating with a degree in political science.

Career
In 1985, at the age of 23, Faure started working as an assistant curriculum officer at the Seychelles education ministry. He also worked as a lecturer at both the National Youth Service and the Seychelles Polytechnic.

In 1993, following the return of multiparty democracy to the island nation, Faure became the leader of government business in the National Assembly, serving in that capacity until 1998. That year, he was appointed Minister of Education. Over the years, he has served in various ministerial capacities including youth, finance, trade and industries, public administration and information and communication technology.

In 2006, he was appointed Minister of Finance by President James Michel. During his tenure at finance, Seychelles embarked on a series of economic reforms, recommended by the International Monetary Fund. Faure oversaw the first generation reforms, which ran from October 2008 to October 2013. Faure served as designated minister between 2004 and 2010. He became Vice President on 1 July 2010, while retaining the finance portfolio.

Presidency

President James Michel announced on 27 September 2016 that he would resign, effective on 16 October, and transfer power to Vice President Faure. The announcement coincided with the election of an opposition majority in the National Assembly. As there were four years of Michel's term remaining, it was to count as a full term for Faure. Faure was accordingly sworn in on 16 October 2016.

On 14 April 2019, Faure visited a British research submersible and made a speech from underwater, pleading for stronger protections for the world's oceans.

On 13 June 2019, Faure was awarded the National Geographic Society’s prestigious ‘Planetary and Leadership Award’ at a National Geographic Awards Ceremony, at the George Washington University, in Washington DC.

Personal life
Danny Faure is divorced. He is the father of four daughters and one son.

He married Shermin Rudie Bastienne on 4 April 2021.

See also
List of foreign ministers in 2017
List of current foreign ministers

References

|-

1962 births
Education ministers of Seychelles
Finance Ministers of Seychelles
Foreign Ministers of Seychelles
Industry ministers of Seychelles
Trade ministers of Seychelles
Youth ministers of Seychelles
Living people
United Seychelles Party politicians
Presidents of Seychelles
Vice-presidents of Seychelles
University of Havana alumni